Sir Cecil Hanbury  (10 March 1871 – 10 June 1937) was a British Conservative Party politician, the son of Sir Thomas Hanbury and brother of Lady Hilda Currie.

He was elected at the 1924 general election as Member of Parliament (MP) for the Northern division of Dorset, having unsuccessfully contested the seat at both the 1922 and 1923 elections.  Hanbury was re-elected at the next three general elections, and died in office in 1937, aged 66.

He was knighted on 11 July 1935.

References

External links 
 

1871 births
1937 deaths
Conservative Party (UK) MPs for English constituencies
UK MPs 1924–1929
UK MPs 1929–1931
UK MPs 1931–1935
UK MPs 1935–1945
Knights Bachelor